Claude Guiguet (born 28 September 1947) is a French modern pentathlete. He competed at the 1976 Summer Olympics.

References

1947 births
Living people
French male modern pentathletes
Olympic modern pentathletes of France
Modern pentathletes at the 1976 Summer Olympics